The Government Higher Secondary School Pandikkad, Malappuram is one of the biggest schools in Malappuram district, Kerala, India. It has over 800 students in Higher Secondary and over 2500 students in High School and Upper Primary Sections. Over 500 students on average appear for the Class X examinations every year. The Higher Secondary wing have seven batches in Science (2 batches), Commerce (3 batches) and Humanities (2 batches) streams.

Location
The School is located about 1.5 km from Pandikkad Junction. It is about 16 km from Perinthalmanna, 13 km from Manjeri and 26 km from Malappuram (shortest route). The nearest railway stations include Pattikkad (11.7 km), Melattur (10.4 km) and Thuvvur (8.3 km).

Notable alumni

References
http://www.icbse.com/schools/ghss-pandikkad/32050600321

High schools and secondary schools in Kerala
Schools in Malappuram district